Lawson is a hamlet in Maple Bush Rural Municipality No. 224, Saskatchewan, Canada. It previously held the status of village until December 31, 1985. The hamlet is located 12 km north-west of the Town of Central Butte on highway 42 along the now defunct Canadian Pacific Railway subdivision.

History
Prior to December 31, 1985, Lawson was incorporated as a village, and was restructured as a hamlet under the jurisdiction of the Rural municipality of Grass Lake that date.

Notable residents
 Arthur John Lewis, a [Progressive] politician.

See also
List of communities in Saskatchewan
Hamlets of Saskatchewan

References

Maple Bush No. 224, Saskatchewan
Former villages in Saskatchewan
Unincorporated communities in Saskatchewan
Populated places disestablished in 1985